A hypertriton is a type of hypernucleus, formed of a proton, a neutron and any hyperon. The name comes from hyperon, which refers to baryons containing strange quarks, and triton, which refers to the nucleus of tritium. Because low-mass hyperons are longer-lived and easier to create than high-mass hyperons, the most common hypertritons are those containing Lambda baryons – H.

Its antiparticle, the antihypertriton, is formed of an antiproton, an antineutron and any antihyperon. The first one was discovered in March 2010 by the STAR detector of the Relativistic Heavy Ion Collider (RHIC) at Brookhaven National Laboratory.

References

Additional information
 New insight into the particle interactions that may take place at the hearts of neutron stars
 Systematic Nuclear Uncertainties in the Hypertriton System
 Hypertriton lifetime puzzle nears resolution

Exotic matter
Nuclear physics
Strange quark